Miodrag Gemović (born 25 December 1994) is a Serbian professional footballer, playing as a forward for Saudi Arabian club Al-Riyadh.

On 28 August 2021, Gemović joined Saudi Arabian club Al-Khaleej. On 14 June 2022, Gemović joined Al-Riyadh.

Honours
Vojvodina
Serbian Cup: 2019–20

Al-Khaleej
First Division: 2021–22

References

External sources
 
 
 Profile and stats at Srbijafudbal.

1994 births
Living people
Serbian footballers
Association football forwards
FK Mačva Šabac players
FK Čukarički players
FK Sinđelić Beograd players
FK Zemun players
FK Vojvodina players
Khaleej FC players
Al-Riyadh SC players
Sportspeople from Šabac
Serbian First League players
Serbian SuperLiga players
Saudi First Division League players
Expatriate footballers in Saudi Arabia
Serbian expatriate sportspeople in Saudi Arabia